The 1993–94 Botola is the 38th season of the Moroccan Premier League. Olympique de Casablanca are the holders of the title.

References

Morocco 1993–94

Botola seasons
Morocco
Botola